Jai Jawan Jai Makan is a 1971 Bollywood drama film directed by Vishram Bedekar. The film stars Jaya Badhuri and Anil Dhawan.

External links
 

1971 films
1970s Hindi-language films
1971 drama films